A non-denominational person or organization is one that does not follow (or is not restricted to) any particular or specific religious denomination.

Overview
The term has been used in the context of various faiths including Jainism, Baháʼí Faith, Zoroastrianism, Unitarian Universalism, Neo-Paganism, Christianity, Islam, Judaism, Hinduism, Buddhism and Wicca. It stands in contrast with a religious denomination. Religious people of a non-denominational persuasion tend to be more open-minded in their views on various religious matters and rulings. Some converts towards non-denominational strains of thought have been influenced by disputes over traditional teachings in the previous institutions they attended. Nondenominationalism has also been used as a tool for introducing neutrality into a public square when the local populace are derived from a wide-ranging set of religious beliefs. Some also believe that this is the true way of Christianity, but more is to be found about that claim.

See also
 Nondenominational Christianity
 Non-denominational Muslim
 Non-denominational Judaism
 Schism
 Unitarian Universalism

References

Deism